Luciano del Cacho (born 18 September 1947) is a Spanish alpine skier. He competed in the men's downhill at the 1968 Winter Olympics.

References

External links
 

1947 births
Living people
Spanish male alpine skiers
Olympic alpine skiers of Spain
Alpine skiers at the 1968 Winter Olympics
People from Alto Gállego
Sportspeople from the Province of Huesca
20th-century Spanish people